William Antony Swithin Sarjeant (15 July 1935 – 8 July 2002), also known by the pen name Antony Swithin, was a professor of geology at University of Saskatchewan. He was also interested in mystery writing, fantasy writing, folk singing, and heritage preservation.  He received the Sue Tyler Friedman Medal in 1990 for his work in the history of geology.

Born in Sheffield, England, he wrote The Perilous Quest for Lyonesse series of novels (1990-1993) in the vein of The Lord of the Rings. They were set in a fictional land of Rockall based upon the small real island of the same name northwest of Scotland and Ireland.

Sarjeant died of cancer at age 66 in July 2002. Following his death, William Sarjeant Park in the city's Willowgrove neighborhood was named in his honor.

Writings

 Princes of Sandastre
 The Lords of the Stoney Mountains
 The Winds of the Wastelands
 The Nine Gods of Saffadne

External links
 Detailed life history on Wayback Archive
 Wayback Archive of University website listing academic work
 Obituary on Wayback Archive
 

1935 births
2002 deaths
British expatriates in Canada
Canadian male novelists
Academics of the University of Sheffield
Academic staff of the University of Saskatchewan
English male novelists
20th-century English novelists
Canadian fantasy writers
20th-century Canadian geologists
20th-century Canadian male writers
20th-century English male writers